The Commander of the Zimbabwe Defence Forces is Chief of the Zimbabwe Defence Forces and the national defence organisations.

List of chiefs

Commander Combined Operations (Comops), Rhodesian Security Forces
During May 1977, a Combined Operations headquarters (or "Comops" as it was referred to) was formed to direct the activities of all Rhodesian Security Forces. Prior to this, each service had its own command structure and active operations were co-ordinated, at a local level, through Joint Operation Commands (or JOCs). The first (and only) Commander Comops was Lieut.-General G. Peter Walls, former head of the Rhodesian Army. Air Marshal 'Mick' J. McLaren was Deputy Commander.

Chairman, Joint High Command
Following the electoral victory of Robert Mugabe's ZANU party on 4 March 1980 a Joint High Command was established to oversee the integration of the former warring armies.  Lieut.-General Peter Walls (former Commander of the Rhodesian Combined Operations) was appointed as Chairman of the Joint High Command.  Other members included: Lieut.-General A. C. L. ‘Sandy’ Maclean (former Commander Zimbabwe-Rhodesian Army); Air Vice-Marshal Frank Mussell (former Commander Zimbabwe-Rhodesian Air Force); ‘Lieut.-General’ Lookout Masuku (former Commander Zimbabwe People's Revolutionary Army, ZIPRA); ‘Lieut.-General’ Solomon T. Mujuru, alias Rex Nhongo  (former Commander Zimbabwe African National Liberation Army, ZANLA); and Mr Alan Page (Secretary of Defence).

Commander of the Zimbabwe Defence Forces
In July 1980 Lieut-General Walls resigned and was exiled from Zimbabwe.  Lieut-General ‘Sandy’ Maclean was appointed by then Prime Minister Mugabe as the Commander of the Zimbabwe Defence Forces on 8 August 1980, and promoted to General.

References

Zimbabwean military leaders
Zimbabwe